BLD could refer to:

Transportation
 Baildon railway station, England; National Rail station code BLD
 Beresfield railway station, Australia; station code BLD
 Boulder City Airport, Nevada, United States; FAA location identifier BLD (closed c. 1988)
 Boulder City Municipal Airport, Nevada, United States; IATA airport code BLD (opened 1990)

Stocks
 Ballard Power Systems, Toronto Stock Exchange symbol BLD
 Boral, Australian Securities Exchange symbol BLD
 TopBuild Corp., New York Stock Exchange symbol BLD

Other uses
 Bharatiya Lok Dal, a former Indian political party
 Blacklite District, a solo singer
 Blue Lambency Downward, an album by experimental band Kayo Dot
 BLD, a computer-building service by NZXT